Alfred Eugene Jackson (January 11, 1807 – October 30, 1889) was a Confederate States Army brigadier general during the American Civil War. Before the war, he was a farmer, produce wholesaler, miller, manufacturer and transporter of goods by wagon and boat. After the war, he was a tenant farmer in Virginia until he regained some of his property in Tennessee.

Early life
Alfred Eugene Jackson was born on January 11, 1807, in Davidson County, Tennessee. He attended Washington College (presumably Washington College Academy, a predecessor of Tusculum College, both of which were founded by Samuel Doak) and Greeneville College, now Tusculum College. After college he became a farmer and merchant of produce and manufactured wares.  He distributed those goods from North Carolina to the Mississippi River through an extensive transportation network of wagons and boats that he established.

American Civil War
Alfred E. Jackson began his Confederate States Army service as a major on September 11, 1861. Taking advantage of his experience, he served as quartermaster on the staff of Brigadier General Felix Zollicoffer until Zollicoffer was killed at the Battle of Mill Springs Jackson and his Confederate troops spent most of the war pursuing guerrillas and pitching small battles in East Tennessee, eastern Kentucky, southwestern Virginia and western North Carolina.

Jackson served as a paymaster during the Confederate military occupation of Knoxville, Tennessee under the command of then Major General E. Kirby Smith. Jackson's original appointment as a brigadier general on October 29, 1862, was canceled. He was promoted to brigadier general on February 9, 1863.

  In April 1863 Jackson was given command of a brigade in the Department of East Tennessee . The brigade had both cavalry troopers and infantry soldiers and the men in the brigade were rotated in and out at various times. 

In May 1863, Jackson's brigade briefly was attached to the Army of Tennessee. It took part in several minor battles and skirmishes, pursued deserters, raided into eastern Kentucky and southwestern Virginia, attacking both Union loyalist civilians and perceived bushwackers. General Braxton Bragg, former commander of the Army of Tennessee, criticized Jackson in a May 1864 report because his men were in "miserable order." 

Jackson's brigade returned to east Tennessee and was active during Burnside's Knoxville campaign.   September 8th it captured 240 men of the 100th Ohio Infantry at the Battle of Telford's Station, at present-day Telford, Tennessee.   On 20 September 1863 it was among the Confederates forces attacked in a three-day battle along the area of the East Tennessee and Virginia Railroad, running from Jonesboro (present day Jonesborough, Tennessee) to a railroad bridge crossing the Watauga River at Carter's Depot (present day Watauga, Tennessee.  (After the end of the Civil War, the East Tennessee and Virginia Railroad was consolidated with East Tennessee and Georgia Railroad to become the East Tennessee, Virginia and Georgia Railway). Jackson supported Brigadier General John S. Williams in his retreat after the Battle of Blue Springs on October 10th.  Later he helped guard the winter quarters of Lieutenant General James Longstreet's Corps northeast of Knoxville at Russellville, Tennessee during that Corps' detachment to the western theater of the war.  

Jackson's brigade was assigned to Major General Robert Ransom Jr's. division between October 1863 and February 1864, Brigadier General Bushrod R. Johnson's division in  February and March 1864, and Major General Simon Buckner's division in April and May 1864.  All in the Confederate Trans-Allegheny Department. 

From September 30, 1864 Jackson and his brigade assisted in the defense of Saltville, Virginia, in the Confederate Department of East Tennessee and West Virginia, successor to the Trans-Allegheny Department, . On November 23, 1864 Jackson was assigned to light staff duty under Major General John C. Breckinridge in the same department . Historian John Stanchak states that this implies the 57-year-old Jackson was in poor health.

Postwar years
After the war, Jackson was impoverished and rented land in Washington County, Virginia, which he cultivated with his own hands. President Andrew Johnson granted Jackson a special pardon on November 16, 1865, because of kindness shown by Jackson to Johnson's family in East Tennessee during the war. Because of the pardon, Jackson gradually regained enough of his property to return to Jonesboro, Tennessee.

Alfred Eugene Jackson died October 30, 1889, at Jonesboro, Tennessee, and is buried there.

Nickname controversy
There is a controversy about the nickname Mudwall. While fellow Confederate General William Lowther Jackson from West Virginia (no family relation) has been known as such for a long time it was found by noted historian Garry W. Gallagher that the nickname was originally given to Alfred Jackson. It seems the two were mixed up in the Southern Historical Society Papers in 1906 and the error was involuntarily repeated afterwards. Sometimes the name is even attributed to another (likewise not related) Confederate Brigadier, John K. Jackson. It is also possible that at times the name was attributed to several of the Jacksons simultaneously.

See also

List of American Civil War generals (Confederate)

Notes

References
 Boatner, Mark Mayo, III. The Civil War Dictionary. New York: McKay, 1988. . First published 1959 by McKay.
 Eicher, John H., and David J. Eicher, Civil War High Commands. Stanford: Stanford University Press, 2001. .
 Sifakis, Stewart. Who Was Who in the Civil War. New York: Facts On File, 1988. .
 Stanchak, John E. "Jackson, Alfred Eugene" in Historical Times Illustrated History of the Civil War, edited by Patricia L. Faust. New York: Harper & Row, 1986. .
 Warner, Ezra J. Generals in Gray: Lives of the Confederate Commanders. Baton Rouge: Louisiana State University Press, 1959. .
 Will the Real "Mudwall" Please Stand Up? (pdf)

1807 births
1889 deaths
Confederate States Army brigadier generals
People of Tennessee in the American Civil War
People from Davidson County, Tennessee
Tusculum University alumni
People from Jonesborough, Tennessee